The Master Players Concert Series (MP; MPCS) is a flagship, in-residence concert organization at the University of Delaware (UD), founded in 2004 by producing artistic director Xiang Gao. Gao holds the endowed UD Distinguished Professor of Music and is a world-renowned concert violinist.  He was also awarded a 2014 Delaware Governor's Award for the Arts for his contributions to the state as a musician and innovator. Under his leadership, Master Players presents classical, crossover, world and jazz music; dance; musical theatre, family pops concerts, outreach education and community concerts; and the Master Players Festival.

Master Players Concert Series brings national and international artists and programs offered in major concert venues worldwide to University of Delaware and the surrounding communities. Most recently MP hosted the Juilliard String Quartet in November 2015. Delaware Division of the Arts has said that it is “the most creative concert presenting organization in the area.”

References

External links
Official website

Events in Delaware
Classical music in the United States
University of Delaware